Hoya coronaria is an epiphyte of the family Apocynaceae. It is native to Southeast Asia.

References

coronaria